Christian or Kristian Pedersen may refer to:

 Kristian Pedersen (born 1994), Danish footballer
 Christian Pedersen (cyclist) (1920–1999), Danish cyclist
 Christian Pedersen (gymnast) (1889–1953), Danish Olympic gymnast
 Christian Pedersen (rower) (born 1982), Danish rower and member of the Gold Four
 Christian Pedersen (sport shooter) (1874–1957), Danish Olympic sports shooter
 Christian Theodore Pedersen (1876–1969), Norwegian-American seaman, whaling captain and fur trader
 Kristian Tønder (Kristian Pedersen Tønder, 1860–1934), Norwegian priest and politician